Governor Baxter may refer to:

Elisha Baxter (1827–1899), 10th Governor of Arkansas
George W. Baxter (1855–1929), territorial governor of Wyoming
Percival Proctor Baxter (1876–1969), 53rd Governor of Maine
 Governor Baxter School for the Deaf, named for Percival Proctor Baxter